Northern Kalapuyan is an extinct Kalapuyan language indigenous to northwestern Oregon in the United States. It was spoken by Kalapuya groups in the northern Willamette Valley southwest of present-day Portland.

Three distinct dialects of the language have been identified. The Tualatin dialect (Tfalati, Atfalati) was spoken along the Tualatin River. The Yamhill (Yamhala) dialect was spoken along the Yamhill River. The language is closely related to Central Kalapuya, spoken by related groups in the central and southern Willamette Valley.

The terminal speaker of Northern Kalapuya was Louis Kenoyer who died in 1937.

References

Kalapuyan languages
Indigenous languages of Oregon
Indigenous languages of the Pacific Northwest Coast
Kalapuya, Northern
Extinct languages of North America
Languages extinct in the 1930s
1937 disestablishments in Oregon
Native American history of Oregon